Tokinivae is an islet of Nui atoll, in the Pacific Ocean state of Tuvalu. Nui tradition is that Kolaka, a warrior from Nukufetau came on several raiding expeditions to Tokinivae, until he was killed and buried at Tararorae.

References

External links
Map of Nui showing Tokinivae

Islands of Tuvalu
Nui (atoll)